The Kisumu Power Station, also Kisumu One Solar Power Station, is a  solar power plant under development in Kenya. It is owned by Ergon Solair Africa (ESA), based in Nairobi, Kenya. ESA is a subsidiary of Ergon Solair PBC, an American independent power producer, headquartered in Wilmington, Delaware, United States. The off-taker is the national electricity distribution company, Kenya Power and Lighting Company, under a long-term power purchase agreement.

Location

Overview
Its output is to be sold directly to Kenya Power Limited for integration into the national grid. The power is to be evacuated to a 220 kV substation near the solar farm, where it will enter the grid. It is expected that this power station will add 105.3 MWh of electricity to the national grid annually.

Developers
The table below illustrates the ownership of Kisumu One Solar Limited, the special purpose vehicle company that owns and is developing the solar farm.

 Note: On this project, Ergon Solair PBC is working through its wholly owned Kenyan subsidiary Ergon Solair Africa Limited.

Construction costs and timeline
The construction costs have been reported as approximately US$64 million (about KSh. 7.6 billion in August 2022). Construction is expected to commence in the second half of 2022. Commercial commissioning is anticipated in December 2023. On  8 August 2022, Afrik21.africa, reported that construction of the power station had started.

Other considerations
It has been reported that the PPA between Kenya Power and the owners of this power station will be at US$0.0575) for every 1kiloWatthour (1kWh)," basis.

See also

List of power stations in Kenya

References

External links
 Kenya: Ergon Solar gets the green light for the construction of its solar power plant in Kisumu As of 9 April 2020.

Solar power stations in Kenya
Kisumu County
Proposed solar power stations
Energy infrastructure in Africa